Daniel Maximin (born April 9, 1947) is a Guadeloupean novelist, poet, and essayist.  Born in Saint-Claude, his family moved to France when he was thirteen.  He studied at the Sorbonne and from 1980 to 1989 served as literary director of the journal Présence africaine.  He returned to Guadeloupe in 1989 as Regional Director of Cultural Affairs.  He was named a knight of the Légion d'honneur in 1993.

Works
 "Sartre Listening to Savages". Telos 44 (Summer 1980). New York: Telos Press.
 L'Isolé soleil (novel), 1981
 Soufrières (novel), 1987
 Lone Sun, 1989
 L'Invention des désirades (poetry), 2000
 L'Ile et une nuit (novel), 2002
 Tu, c'est l'enfance, 2004 (awarded the Prix Maurice Genevoix)
 Les Fruits du cyclone : Une géopoétique de la Caraïbe, 2006

Bibliography
Chaulet-Achour, Christiane. La Trilogie caribéenne de Daniel Maximin : Analyse et contrepoint. Paris, Karthala, 2000.
Kaufman, Janice Horner. Daniel Maximin, Hélène Cixous and Aimé Césaire : Creolization, Intertextuality, and Coiled Myth. New York, Peter Lang, 2006.

External links
 Un entretien avec Daniel Maximin sur RFO Guadeloupe en 2004

1947 births
Living people
People from Saint-Claude, Guadeloupe
Guadeloupean novelists
University of Paris alumni
20th-century French novelists
21st-century French novelists
Guadeloupean poets
Chevaliers of the Légion d'honneur
French people of Guadeloupean descent
Prix Maurice Genevoix winners
French male essayists
French male poets
French male novelists
20th-century French essayists
21st-century French essayists
Guadeloupean essayists
20th-century French male writers
21st-century French male writers